Felix Manalo Ysagun (born Félix Ysagun y Manalo; May 10, 1886 – April 12, 1963), also known as Ka Felix, was the leader and the first Executive Minister of Iglesia ni Cristo. Followers see Manalo as a prophet and the last messenger of God. He is the father of Eraño G. Manalo, who succeeded him as Executive Minister of the INC, and the grandfather of Eduardo V. Manalo, the current Executive Minister of Iglesia ni Cristo.

Felix Manalo is the leader of Iglesia ni Cristo, a non-Trinitarian church that originated in the Philippines since 1913. The official doctrine of Iglesia ni Cristo professes that Félix Manalo y Ysagun is the last messenger of God, sent to reestablish the first church founded by Jesus Christ, which the INC claims to have fallen into apostasy following the death of the Apostles.

Biography
Félix Manalo y Ysagun the Messenger of Iglesia ni Cristo (Popularly known as "Félix Manalo") was born in Barrio Calzada, Tipas, Taguig, Manila province (transferred to Rizal province in 1901 and now part of Metro Manila), Philippines, on May 10, 1886. He was raised in a rural setting by his devout Catholic parents, Mariano Ysagun and Bonifacia Manalo y Cruz. With their livelihood based on a combination of agricultural work, shrimp catching and mat making, they were humble people who lived on the edge of poverty.  During a childhood disrupted by his father's death, his mother's remarriage and the Philippine Revolution, and an adolescence overshadowed by the Filipino-American War, Manalo received only a few years of formal schooling.

Late in the 1890s, after a telling lapse of faith, the teenage Manalo rejected Catholicism. At the time he resided in Manila with his uncle Father Mariano Borja, a priest assigned to the urban parish of Sampaloc. Severely rebuked for privately studying the Bible, Manalo began forthwith to question many basic Catholic doctrines. He also sought solace in other religious groups. According to the National Historical Commission of the Philippines, the establishment of the Philippine Independent Church or the Aglipayan Church was his major turning point, but Manalo remained uninterested since its doctrines were mainly Catholic. In 1904, he joined the Methodist Episcopal Church, entered the Methodist seminary, and became a pastor for a while. He also sought through various denominations, including the Presbyterian Church, Christian Mission, and finally Seventh-day Adventist Church in 1911. There Manalo laboured as trusted evangelist before quarrelling with Adventist leaders over matters of doctrine and customary authority relationships between Westerners and Filipinos. He was disfellowshipped from the SDA faith in 1913. Then, displeased with the various branches of Christianity brought to the Philippines by foreign missionaries, Manalo began to mingle with a diverse crowd of atheists and freethinkers who had rejected organized religion.

Establishment of the Iglesia ni Cristo

In November 1913, Manalo secluded himself with religious literature and unused notebooks in a friend's house in Pasay, instructing everyone in the house not to disturb him. He emerged from his silence three days later with his newfound doctrines and principles.

Felix Manalo, together with his wife, Honorata, went to Punta that same month and began preaching. He also returned to Taguig to evangelize and preach; there, he was ridiculed and questioned by the townsfolk during his meetings. He was later able to baptize a few converts, including some of his persecutors. He registered his newfound religion as the Iglesia ni Cristo (English: Church of Christ; Spanish: Iglesia de Cristo) on July 27, 1914, at the Bureau of Commerce as a unipersonal corporation with himself as the first Executive Minister and founder. Expansion followed as the Iglesia started building congregations in the provinces as early as 1916. The denomination's first three ministers were ordained in 1919.

By 1924, the INC had about 3,000 to 5,000 adherents in 43 or 45 congregations in Manila and six nearby provinces. By 1936, the INC had 85,000 members. This figure grew to 200,000 by 1954. A Cebu congregation was built in 1937—the first to be established outside of Luzon, and the first in the Visayas. The first mission to Mindanao was in 1946. Meanwhile, the INC's first concrete chapel was built in Sampaloc, Manila, in 1948. Adherents fleeing Manila, where the Japanese forces were concentrated during the Second World War, were used for evangelization. As Manalo's health began to fail in the 1950s, his son Eraño started to take leadership of the church.

On November 30, 1955, Felix led the dedication of the chapel of the Locale of Pasay, simultaneously with the offering of Brother Eraño's newborn son Brother Eduardo V. Manalo, the current Executive Minister.

Death

On April 2, 1963, Manalo was confined to hospital for treatment of peptic ulcer disease, which brought him constant pain that medication did not help. On April 11, 1963, doctors performed a third surgery on him, which would be his last. Manalo died on April 12, 1963, at 2:35 in the morning, at the age of 76. Leadership of the Iglesia passed to his son, Eraño, who was chosen unanimously by the district ministers in 1953. His remains were viewed by mourners in the INC's 3,200-seater chapel in San Francisco del Monte, Quezon City. On April 23, he was buried at what was then the central office of the Iglesia ni Cristo in San Juan, Rizal. The local police estimated the crowd at the funeral procession to have been 2 million, and the rite took five hours.

Works
Aug Sulo Sa Ikatitiyak Sa Iglesia Katolika Apostolika Romana written by Felix Y. Manalo himself, published in 1947.
Mga Katotohanan Dapat Malaman Ukol Sa Mga Aral Ng Iglesia Katolika Apostolika Romano. 1914

Recognition

The ministers of the Christian Mission honored him on December 25, 1918, as an outstanding evangelist.

The Genius Divinical College of Manila on Avenida, Rizal, a non-sectarian institution headed by Eugenio Guerero, conferred on Felix Manalo the degree of Master of Biblo-Science honoris causa on March 28, 1931.

On July 27, 2007, coinciding with the 93rd anniversary of the Iglesia ni Cristo, the National Historical Institute (NHI) of the Philippines unveiled a marker on the birthplace of Felix Manalo, declaring the site as a National Historical Landmark. The marker is located at Barangay Calzada, Tipas, Taguig, Metro Manila where the ancestral home of Manalo once stood. The marker sits on a 744-square-meter plaza. In his dedication speech, Ludovico Badoy, NHI executive director, said, "Brother Felix Manalo's significant contribution to Philippine Society is worth recognizing and emulating." He further said, "... the church he preached [has] changed the lives and faith of many Filipinos. He deserves the pride and recognition of the people of Taguig." The responsibility, maintenance, and operation of the landmark was turned over to the INC.

On the same year, the Philippine government declared July 27 of every year as "Iglesia ni Cristo Day" to enable millions of INC followers in the Philippines and in 75 countries around the world to observe the occasion with fitting solemnity.

On May 10, 2014, coinciding his 128th birth anniversary, the Philippine Postal Corp. (Philpost) launched the Iglesia ni Cristo Centennial Commemorative Stamp at the INC Central Office in Diliman, Quezon City, to mark the 100th anniversary of the church's registration in the Philippines. The stamp features the INC Central Temple and Felix Manalo in sepia. At the bottom of the stamp is the INC centennial logo in color. Philpost issued 1.2 million of the stamps, which is more than twice the number of stamps they usually issue for a single design. The stamp, 50 millimeters by 35 mm, is bigger than the ordinary-sized 40 mm by 30 mm stamps.

In some cities and towns in the Philippines, the adjacent street near an INC locale is renamed F. Manalo to honor Felix Manalo's contributions in Philippine history.

Notes

References

External links

 Iglesia ni Cristo Official Website
 Iglesia ni Cristo Media Services
 Felix Y. Manalo Foundation Inc.

1886 births
1963 deaths
Filipino Christian religious leaders
Felix
Founders of new religious movements
Filipino evangelists
Filipino Protestants
Filipino Methodists
Methodist ministers
Former Protestants
Former Roman Catholics
Christian and Missionary Alliance
Tagalog people
People from Taguig
People of Spanish colonial Philippines
Prophets